Milhau is a family name. Notable people with it include:

 Jean Milhau (born 1929), French politician 
 Marie-Louise Puech-Milhau (1876–1966), French pacifist, feminist and journal editor
 Moses ben Michael Milhau (born ), French rabbi and poet
 Roger Milhau (born 1955),  French middle-distance runner 
 Zella de Milhau (1870–1954), American artist, ambulance driver, community organizer and motorcycle policewoman

See also 

 Milhau, a commune in Aveyron
 Milhaud, a French family name